Raffaele Fitto (born 28 August 1969) is an Italian politician and a member of the European Parliament. He is serving as the minister of European affairs in the Meloni Cabinet since 2022.

Career
Born in Maglie, Fitto was elected in 1999 at European Parliament for Forza Italia.

On 17 May 2015, Fitto left Forza Italia and the European People's Party parliamentary group to join the European Conservatives and Reformists.

In 2022 he was appointed to the Meloni government. He was replaced in the European Parliament by Denis Nesci.

Trials

Bribery towards the Italian public health care system
Fitto in 2006 was investigated by the Bari prosecutor in connection with a donation to his regional party La Puglia Prima di Tutto of 500,000 Euros by Tosinvest, a company owned by Antonio Angelucci, ahead of the 2005 Apulian regional election. According to the prosecution this amount was suspected of being a bribe to secure for the Apulia region the management of eleven nursing homes.

A request to arrest Fitto, who in the meantime had become a Member of the Italian Parliament, was rejected by the Italian Chamber of Deputies. Fitto in December 2009 was found guilty of abuse of office, corruption and illegal financing of political parties; Fitto was acquitted of some other charges in June 2012.

Fitto in February 2013 was sentenced by the Court of first instance (Tribunale di Primo Grado, the first grade) to four years in prison and five years' disqualification from public office; the sentence was commuted to 1 year.

Fitto in September 2015 was acquitted of all charges by the Court of second instance (Corte d'Appello, the second grade).

Fitto in June 2017 was acquitted of all charges by the Supreme Court of Cassation (Corte di Cassazione, the final grade).

Bankruptcy of Cedis
Fitto in February 2009 was accused of conspiring, during his presidency of the Apulia region (2000–2005), Italy, to short-sell the trading company "Cedis", at that time (2004–2006) in administration. The charges were filed in April 2009; however in March 2017 Fitto was acquitted of all charges by the Court of second instance (Corte d'Appello, the second grade).

References

External links
  Raffaele Fitto - official website
  Direzione Italia - official website
 

1969 births
Living people
People from Maglie
Italian People's Party (1994) politicians
United Christian Democrats politicians
Forza Italia politicians
The People of Freedom politicians
Forza Italia (2013) politicians
Conservatives and Reformists (Italy) politicians
Direction Italy politicians
Deputies of Legislature XV of Italy
Deputies of Legislature XVI of Italy
Deputies of Legislature XVII of Italy
Presidents of Apulia
MEPs for Italy 1999–2004
MEPs for Italy 2014–2019
MEPs for Italy 2019–2024
Deputies of Legislature XIX of Italy
Meloni Cabinet
Government ministers of Italy